The year 2006 was the 225th year of the Rattanakosin Kingdom of Thailand. It was the 61st year of the reign of King Bhumibol Adulyadej (Rama IX) and is reckoned as the year 2549 in the Buddhist Era. Major events include the celebration of King Bhumibol's Diamond Jubilee, and the intensification of the 2005–06 Thai political crisis, which culminated in a coup d'état on 19 September.

Incumbents
King: Bhumibol Adulyadej 
Crown Prince: Vajiralongkorn
Prime Minister: 
 until 5 April: Thaksin Shinawatra 
 5 April-23 May: Chitchai Wannasathit (acting)
 23 May-19 September: Thaksin Shinawatra 
 19 September-1 October: Council for National Security (junta)
 starting 1 October: Surayud Chulanont
Supreme Patriarch: Nyanasamvara Suvaddhana

Events

January

February

March

April
2006 Thai general election took place in April; elections took place for the House of Representatives of Thailand and for the Senate of Thailand. Thaksin Shinawatra won the election to be the next Prime Minister, but decided to resign two days afterward.

May

June

 9 June – 60th Anniversary Celebrations of Bhumibol Adulyadej's Accession

July

August

September

 19 September – 2006 Thai coup d'état

October

November

December
2006 Bangkok bombings took place on December 31, 2006 and January 1, 2007. Almost 40 people were injured.

Births

Deaths

See also
 2006 Thailand national football team results
 2006 Thailand National Games
 Miss Thailand Universe 2006
 2006 Thailand Open (tennis)
 2006 in Thai television
 List of Thai films of 2006

References

External links
Year 2006 Calendar - Thailand

 
Years of the 21st century in Thailand
Thailand